ware is a type of Persian pottery developed in Sultanabad, Iran, during the course of Ilkhanid rule in Persia.

Background
The Mongols, having conquered Persia during the early 13th century, sacked the Abbasid capital of Baghdad in 1258, establishing the Ilkhanate state. The Ilkhanate period (1258-1339) marked the introduction of a number of stylistic, iconographic and decorative innovations in Persian ceramics. These innovations were influenced by Chinese ceramics and Far Eastern textiles. Further, the technical proficiency of Persian ceramic art was advanced through collaboration among craftsmen from different traditions.

Ware
A 1930s archeological survey of villages in the vicinity of Sultanabad, Iran uncovered that the region was a major center of Ilkhanid ceramic industry. Ilkhanid ceramics distinguished by their heavy potting, along with thick translucent glaze were henceforth called Sultanabad ware. Sultanabad ware includes Colored Ground wares, ʿErāq wares, Black underglaze painted turquoise glazed wares, as well as blue and black Panel wares. Common motifs in Sultanabad ware include stylized blue and green foliage, pheasants or other birds, hares, deer. Mongol figures (often wearing feather caps) are rather more rare. The use of pseudo-inscriptions around the rims of the vessels and the Mongolian decorative themes, hint at the fact that the buyers of those wares were Turco-Mongolians. Although produced on a large scale, detailed and well preserved pieces are rare. ʿErāq wares showcasing the introduction of a pale blue underglaze colorants being a notable example.

Gallery

Footnotes

References

 

Iranian pottery
13th century in Iran
14th century in Iran
Ilkhanate